Peter Zychla (born 19 July 1963) is a former Australian rules footballer who played with Geelong in the Victorian Football League (VFL). After an unsuccessful first two seasons with Geelong, Zychla was dropped from the senior side. He was given a second opportunity in 1985 but failed to play another senior game.

References
 Holmesby, Russell & Main, Jim (2007). The Encyclopedia of AFL Footballers. 7th ed. Melbourne: Bas Publishing.

External links
 
 

1963 births
Living people
Australian rules footballers from Victoria (Australia)
Geelong Football Club players
St Mary's Sporting Club Inc players